Seven ships of the Royal Navy have borne the name HMS Peacock:

 was a ship captured in 1651 and sold in 1658.
HMS Peacock was an 18-gun sloop, previously . She was captured in 1812, renamed Loup Cervier, renamed Peacock in 1813, and foundered in 1814.
 was a wooden screw  launched in 1856 and broken up in 1869.
 was a composite screw gunboat launched in 1888 and sold in 1906.
 was a  sloop launched in 1943 and scrapped in 1958.

References

Royal Navy ship names